Frederick White may refer to:

Politics and law
Fred White (marshal) (c. 1849–1880), young lawman and the first town marshal of Tombstone, Arizona
Frederick Edward White (1844–1920), U.S. Representative from Iowa
Frederick D. White (1847–1918), Canadian politician
Fred J. White (1886–1967), provincial level politician and labour activist in Canada
Fred White (politician) (1927–1973), Australian politician

Sports
Fred White (Australian footballer) (1877–1907), Australian rules footballer for Geelong
Fred White (footballer, born 1880) (1880–?), English football player for Luton Town
Fred White (footballer, born 1916) (1916–2007), English football goalkeeper for Sheffield United and Lincoln City
 Fred White (ice hockey), Stanley Cup champion with Ottawa Silver Seven
Fred White (rugby league), New Zealand rugby player 
Fred White (sportscaster) (1936–2013), American sportscaster

Other
Death of Frederick John White (1819–1846), British soldier
Fred M. White (Frederick Merrick White, 1859–1935),British  writer
Frederick Manson White (1863–1952), American architect
Sir Fred White (physicist) (Frederick William George White, 1905–1994), New Zealand-born Australian physicist and ornithologist
Freddie White (born 1951), Irish singer-songwriter
Fred White (musician) (1955–2023), American musician with Earth, Wind & Fire

See also
Frederick Whyte (1883–1970), British civil servant and writer
Frederick Methvan Whyte (1865–1941), mechanical engineer